MAVA may refer to:
 MAVA-Renault, a Greek company
 Men Against Violence and Abuse, an Indian organisation
 Multiple abstract variance analysis, a technique in statistics

Mava may refer to the following villages in Iran:
Mava, Chenaran, in Razavi Khorasan Province
Mava, Nishapur, in Razavi Khorasan Province
Mava, Hamadan
Mava, Kermanshah (disambiguation)
Mava, Khuzestan (disambiguation)

People with the name 
 Mava Lee Thomas (1929–2013), American baseball player